Yul Vazquez (born March 18, 1965) is a Cuban-American actor and musician. He has appeared in Runaway Bride (1999), Bad Boys II (2003), War of the Worlds (2005), American Gangster (2007), The A-Team (2010), Captain Phillips (2013), The Infiltrator (2016), Midnight, Texas (2017–2018), Russian Doll (2019), and Severance (2022). Vazquez used to be the lead guitarist for melodic rock bands Urgent and Diving for Pearls.

Early life
Vazquez was born in Cuba on March 18, 1965 and came to the United States with his family as part of the Cuban Exodus in 1971. He was named after Russian actor Yul Brynner. He grew up in Miami in a studio apartment with his mother, grandmother and older sister, thus being the youngest as well as the only boy in the household. His mother encouraged him in the arts, often taking him to the theater where she worked, and she bought him his first drum set and camera.

Acting career
Vazquez started his acting career with filler parts in his mother's plays, which led to discovery by an agent who encouraged him to go to acting school. In the 80s, he was lead guitarist for two Billboard-charted rock bands. His musical skills led him to land the part of Flaco in the 1992 film The Mambo Kings.

Vazquez went on to numerous film and television projects. With over 40 film credits, other highlights include roles in six time Oscar nominee Captain Phillips (2013), The A-Team (2010) with Liam Neeson, John Sayles's Amigo, Steven Soderbergh’s two-part epic Che (2008), The Take (2008), American Gangster, Music Within (2007), War of the Worlds (2005), Bad Boys II (2003), Traffic and Runaway Bride (1999). He has also been in Kill the Messenger starring Jeremy Renner and directed by Michael Cuesta; Anesthesia; and The Cobbler, opposite Adam Sandler, Dustin Hoffman and Steve Buscemi.

In television, he has had many guest and recurring roles. In Lifetime's series The Lottery he starred as President Thomas Westwood and as The Reverend Emilio Sheehan in the NBC series Midnight, Texas. He was a regular for both seasons of the Starz drama Magic City, where he portrayed Victor Lazaro, general manager of the Miramar Playa. Additionally, he has recurred in other television series, as Pedro in FX's Louie, as Christian in CBS's The Good Wife and as Det. Anthony Nikolich on the HBO television series Treme. In the streaming world, he has had recurring roles in several hit shows including Netflix's Russian Doll, and AppleTVPlus's Severance.

Vazquez is a founding member of the LAByrinth Theater Company and served two terms as co-artistic director with Stephen Adly Guirgis and Mimi O'Donnell in New York City. Vazquez starred on Broadway in the Tony nominated The Motherfucker with the Hat opposite Chris Rock. For his portrayal of the eccentric Cousin Julio, he received nominations for a Drama Desk Award, an Outer Critics Circle Award and a Tony Award for Best Featured Actor in a Play. Additional theater credits include The Last Days of Judas Iscariot (The Public Theater) opposite Sam Rockwell, directed by Philip Seymour Hoffman, Terrence McNally's Stendhal Syndrome, Primary Stages with Isabella Rossellini and Richard Thomas, and The Floating Island Plays (Mark Taper Forum).

Music career
Prior to starting his acting career, Vazquez was the lead guitar player for East Coast Album-oriented rock (AOR) bands Urgent and Diving For Pearls. Urgent landed a minor hit with their single "Running Back" which reached #79 on the Billboard Hot 100. A second single from their Cast The First Stone debut album, "Love Can Make You Cry", was featured on the Iron Eagle soundtrack. Urgent broke up in 1987 after the lackluster success of their sophomore album, Thinking Out Loud.

Following the demise of Urgent, Vazquez joined Diving for Pearls, whose eponymous debut album was issued by Epic/Sony Music in 1989. The group was dropped by the label before a second album could be completed due to the musical climate changing in the early 1990s as melodic hard rock fell out of favor in the U.S.

In 2009, Vazquez played acoustic guitar with Ian Astbury of The Cult under the name The Soft Revolt appearing at the Bowery Electric in New York City on the opening night of John Patrick Shanley's play Savage in Limbo, which Astbury was producing. They performed songs by The Cult and Astbury solo material as well as covers by the Rolling Stones, Black Sabbath, Radiohead, among others.

In the 2022 show Severance, Vazquez actually sings and plays a cover of Metallica's Enter Sandman in the fourth episode.

Personal life
Vazquez has been married to actress Linda Larkin since May 18, 2002. Larkin is best known for being the speaking voice of Princess Jasmine in Disney's 1992 animated feature film Aladdin.

Filmography

Film

Television

Videogames

Discography
Urgent – Cast the First Stone (EMI-Manhattan, 1985)
Various – Iron Eagle OST (Capitol, 1986)
Urgent – Thinking Out Loud (EMI-Manhattan, 1987)
Diving For Pearls – Diving for Pearls (Epic/Sony, 1989)
Diving For Pearls –  Texas (2006)

References

External links

 

LAByrinth Theater Company

Living people
1965 births
American male film actors
American male television actors
American male voice actors
Cuban emigrants to the United States
Hispanic and Latino American actors
American entertainers of Cuban descent
Cuban male film actors
20th-century American male actors
21st-century American male actors
American rock guitarists